Emmanuelle Bercot (born 6 November 1967) is a French actress, film director and screenwriter. Her film Clément was screened in the Un Certain Regard section at the 2001 Cannes Film Festival. Her 2013 film On My Way premiered in competition at the 63rd Berlin International Film Festival.

Her 2015 film Standing Tall was selected to open the 2015 Cannes Film Festival. At Cannes, Bercot won the award for Best Actress for her role in Mon roi.

Filmography

As actress

Filmmaker

Decorations 
 Chevalier of the Legion of Honour (2015)

See also
 List of female film and television directors

References

External links

1967 births
Living people
French film actresses
20th-century French actresses
21st-century French actresses
French women film directors
Actresses from Paris
French women screenwriters
French screenwriters
Cannes Film Festival Award for Best Actress winners
Chevaliers of the Ordre des Arts et des Lettres
Chevaliers of the Légion d'honneur